Handiganur is a village in Haveri district in the northern state of Karnataka, India.

References

Villages in Belagavi district